is a major holding company in Japan, headquartered in Yaesu, Chūō, Tokyo.

It was established with a capitalization of 30 billion yen on September 3, 2007. It holds 100% of the stock in Daimaru Matsuzakaya Department Stores, which operates the department-store chains Daimaru and Matsuzakaya. It is traded on the Tokyo, Osaka, and Nagoya Stock Exchanges. J. Front's registered headquarters are in the Matsuzakaya Ginza store.

Subsidiaries
Subsidiaries of J. Front include:
Daimaru Matsuzakaya Department Stores (Department stores)
Peacock Stores (Supermarket)
The Daimaru Home Shopping
Daimaru Matsuzakaya Tomonokai
Daimaru COM Development
Parco Co., Ltd.
Daimaru Kogyo (Wholesale)
Credit Business
JFR Card
Other Businesses
J. Front Design & Construction
J. Front Foods
Dimples’
JFR Information Center
JFR Office Support
JFR Service
JFR Consulting
Consumer Product End-Use Research Institute
Angel Park
Central Park Building

References

External links

Official site
Official site 

 
Retail companies based in Tokyo
Companies listed on the Tokyo Stock Exchange
Companies listed on the Osaka Exchange
Holding companies based in Tokyo
Japanese companies established in 2007
Holding companies established in 2007
Retail companies established in 2007